Colona is a city in Henry County, Illinois, along the Green River. It is part of the Quad Cities metropolitan area.  The population was 5,307 at the 2020 census, up from 5,099 at the 2010 census.

The City of Colona was created in 1997 by the merger of the former City of Green Rock and the former Village of Colona. It was the first community in Illinois to merge by popular vote.

Geography
Colona is located at  (41.475684, -90.348787). Colona lies near the Rock River in a valley, and is surrounded by higher land. This is where the Green River and Hennepin Canal flow into the Rock River (Mississippi River).

Demographics

As of the census of 2000, there were 5,173 people, 1,936 households, and 1,473 families living in the city. The racial makeup of the city was 96.58% White, 0.31% African American, 0.25% Native American, 0.17% Asian, 1.70% from other races, and 0.99% from two or more races. Hispanic or Latino of any race were 4.06% of the population.

There were 1,936 households, out of which 37.1% had children under the age of 18 living with them, 61.5% were married couples living together, 9.7% had a female householder with no husband present, and 23.9% were non-families. 20.0% of all households were made up of individuals, and 7.5% had someone living alone who was 65 years of age or older.  The average household size was 2.67 and the average family size was 3.05.

In the city, the population was spread out, with 27.5% under the age of 18, 9.2% from 18 to 24, 30.9% from 25 to 44, 22.8% from 45 to 64, and 9.5% who were 65 years of age or older.  The median age was 34 years. For every 100 females, there were 100.1 males.  For every 100 females age 18 and over, there were 95.2 males.

The median income for a household in the city was $41,476, and the median income for a family was $48,250. Males had a median income of $33,826 versus $20,909 for females. The per capita income for the city was $17,265.  About 4.6% of families and 7.6% of the population were below the poverty line, including 10.8% of those under age 18 and 1.6% of those age 65 or over.

References

External links
 City of Colona, official website

Cities in Illinois
Cities in Henry County, Illinois
Cities in the Quad Cities